Poplar Bluff Township is one of ten townships in Butler County, Missouri, USA.  As of the 2010 census, its population was 25,878.

Geography
It contains seventeen cemeteries: Ashcraft, Black Creek, Carpenter Bend, Dooley, Friendship, Green Hill, Hvam, Marble Hill, Melton, Memorial Gardens, Morocco, Oak Hill, Podesva, Sacred Heart, Shadle, Sheppard and Woodlawn.

Carpenter Lake is within this township. The streams of Agee Creek, Black Creek, Black River, Buck Creek, Dobbs Creek, Harwell Creek, Hickory Creek, Hoedapp Creek, Indian Creek, Lewis Creek, Mill Creek, Pike Creek and Pike Slough run through this township.

Transportation
Poplar Bluff Township contains three airports or landing strips: Earl Fields Memorial Airport, Hayes Field and Lucy Lee Hospital Heliport.

References

External links
 US-Counties.com
 City-Data.com

Townships in Butler County, Missouri
Townships in Missouri